McKinnon, MacKinnon or Mackinnon is a Scottish surname. (Gaelic: Mac Fhionghain),

Notable people with this surname include:

 Allan McKinnon, P.C., M.C., C.D. (1917–1990), Canadian politician, MP – Victoria 1972-1988
 Alexander "Alex" McKinnon (1895–1949), Canadian professional hockey forward
 Alexander J. McKinnon (1856–1887) American Major League Baseball first baseman
 Angus MacKinnon, Scottish footballer (Queen's Park, Scotland)
 Angus McKinnon (1886–1968), Scottish footballer (Arsenal)
 Angus McKinnon Young (born 1955), Australian Lead Guitarist of band AC/DC and co-founder of AC/DC
 Atholl McKinnon (1932–1983), South African cricketer
 Barry McKinnon (born 1944), Canadian poet
 Betty McKinnon (born 1924), Australian sprinter, silver medal – 4 x 100 metre relay – 1948 Summer Olympics in London
 Bill or Billy Mackinnon, several people
 Bob MacKinnon, American basketball coach
 Bob MacKinnon Jr. (born 1960), American basketball coach
 Casey McKinnon (born 1978), Canadian producer & star of Galacticast
 Catharine MacKinnon, American feminist (born 1946)
 Catherine McKinnon (born 1944), Canadian actress and folk & pop singer
 Cedric McKinnon (1968–2016), American  football player
 Clinton "Bär" McKinnon (born 1969) American saxophone musician in Melbourne, Australia
 Clinton Dotson McKinnon (1906–2001) American politician
 Colin Francis MacKinnon, (1810–1879), Canadian Roman Catholic Archbishop
 Dan Mackinnon, (1903–1983), Australian politician 
 Dave MacKinnon, Scottish professional football player 
 David MacKinnon (born 1994), American baseball player
 Dennis Lewis McKinnon (born 1961), professional American NFL football player
 Donald McKinnon (disambiguation), several people, including:
 Don McKinnon (born 1939), New Zealand politician
 Donald Alexander MacKinnon (1863–1928), Canadian teacher, lawyer, politician and author
 Donald Mackinnon (1859–1932), Australian politician
 Donnie McKinnon (born 1940), Scottish footballer
 Ellen MacKinnon (1926–2001), Canadian politician
 Esther Blaikie MacKinnon (1885–1934), Scottish artist
 Francis MacKinnon (1848–1947), British cricketer
 Frank Douglas MacKinnon (1871–1946), English lawyer, judge and writer
 Frank McKinnon (1934–2015), Canadian sports executive
 Fred McKinnon (b. 196?), American basketball player
 Gary McKinnon (born 1966), British computer hacker
 George Edward MacKinnon (1906–1995), American politician
 Gillies MacKinnon, Scottish film director
 Glen McKinnon (born 1937), Canadian educator and Liberal Party politician
 Harry McKinnon (1910–1989), Australian rugby league footballer and administrator
 Hector McKinnon CC, CMG (1891–1981) Canadian government civil servant
 James MacKinnon (disambiguation), several people 

Jana McKinnon, Australian actress, plays the lead role in 2023 TV series Bad Behaviour 
 Janice MacKinnon (born 1947), Canadian historian
 John McKinnon (disambiguation), several people, including:
 John Kenneth McKinnon (born 1936), Canadian politician & Commissioner of the Yukon (1986–1995)
 John McKinnon (ophthalmologist) (born 1938), New Zealand mountaineer and ophthalmologist
 John Walter McKinnon (born 1950), New Zealand diplomat and public servant
 Johnny McKinnon (1902–1969), Canadian professional NHL hockey player
 Jon MacKinnon, Canadian field hockey player
 Kate McKinnon (born 1984), comedian 
 Lachlan Mackinnon, Scottish poet, critic and literary journalist
 Sir Lachlan Mackinnon (clan chief), 17th century chief of the Clan Mackinnon
 Leila McKinnon (born 1972), Australian TV reporter 
 Marguerite McKinnon (born 1970), Australian journalist
 Malcolm McKinnon (born 1950), New Zealand historian 
 Mark McKinnon (born 1955), adviser to President Bush  
 McKay McKinnon, American plastic surgeon
 Murdock MacKinnon (1865–1944), Canadian politician
 Nathan MacKinnon, Canadian hockey player
 Neil Mackinnon, 17th century minister in the Isle of Skye
 Peter MacKinnon, Canadian lawyer and academic
 Rebecca MacKinnon, American journalist
 Roderick MacKinnon,  Nobel laureate
 Ronald McKinnon (born 1973), American football 
 Ronnie McKinnon (born 1940), Scottish footballer 
 Ross McKinnon (b.????) Australian rugby league player
 Sam Mackinnon, Australian basketball player
 Simmone Jade Mackinnon, Australian actress
 Wade McKinnon (born 1981) Australian NRL rugby player
 Walter McKinnon (1910–1998), senior officer in the New Zealand Army
 William Mackinnon (disambiguation), several people

See also
 Clan MacKinnon, Scottish clan
 McKinnon (disambiguation) – other uses

Surnames of Scottish origin
Anglicised Scottish Gaelic-language surnames